The NSU Challenge is an American college football rivalry game played annually between the Nicholls Colonels football team representing Nicholls State University and Northwestern State Demons football team representing Northwestern State University. Both universities are members of the Southland Conference. The NSU Trophy, which is a wooden trophy enscripted with NSU goes to the winning team. Although Nicholls has changed their athletic brand name from Nicholls State to Nicholls in 2018, thus not going by NSU anymore in athletics, the rivalry is still called the NSU Challenge.

History
The first game in the Nicholls–Northwestern State series was played in 1973.

Game results

See also
 List of NCAA college football rivalry games

References

Additional sources
 Nicholls Colonels Media Guide
 Northwestern State Demons media guide

College football rivalries in the United States
Nicholls Colonels football
Northwestern State Demons football
1973 establishments in Louisiana